João Calvão da Silva (20 February 1952 – 20 March 2018) was a Portuguese politician.

Calvão de Silva attended the University of Coimbra, graduating in 1975. He began teaching at his alma mater in 2003. Elected to the Assembly of the Republic from 1995 to 1999, he later served as Minister of Internal Administration in 2015.

Father of João Nuno Cruz Matos Calvão da Silva.

References

1952 births
2018 deaths
Social Democratic Party (Portugal) politicians
Members of the Assembly of the Republic (Portugal)
Government ministers of Portugal
University of Coimbra alumni
Academic staff of the University of Coimbra
People from Montalegre